Albert Kutal (9 January 1904, Hranice na Moravě – 27 December 1976, Brno) was a Czech art historian of Moravian descent who established classifying principles of Central European Gothic sculpture as one of the first to study and analyse the medieval art of Bohemia and Moravia, and the influence upon it of Southern European iconography. Kutal were influential in the development of formal analysis  in art history in the early 20th century. His magnum opus, still consulted, is Gothic Art in Bohemia and Moravia  (published in English translation in 1971).

Origins and career 
Kutal was born into the family of state geodesist František Kutal in the predominantly Catholic town of Hranice na Moravě, Moravia, Austro-Hungarian Empire (in the sub-region of Záhoří, today in the Czech Republic). He graduated from secondary school in 1923 and went on to attend the University of Brno (1923-1928), where he was a student of Eugen Dostál and wrote his dissertation on the Romanesque and Gothic sculpture in the arch of the Porta coeli Convent in Tišnov, Moravia.

He taught at Brno, and briefly lectured in Paris, Brussels, Leuven, Bonn, Vienna and Graz.

Works
"Quelques remarques sur la sculpture gothique en Boheme", in Actes du XIX. Congres international d'histoire de l'art (Paris, 1959), pp. 100–104.
České gotické sochařstvi, 1350–1450 (Prague, 1962)
"La 'Belle Madone' de Budapest" in Bulletin du Muse'e Hongrois des Beaux-Arts 23 (1963), pp.2I-40.
Gothic Art in Bohemia and Moravia, translated by Till Gottheiner (London, 1971)

References

1904 births
1976 deaths
People from Hranice (Přerov District)
People from the Margraviate of Moravia
Czech art historians
European art curators
Czechoslovak historians
Masaryk University alumni
Herder Prize recipients